John Barratt (23 January 1916 — April 2002) was an English professional footballer who played as a defender.

Career
Barratt began his career at Cannock Chase Colliery, signing for Wolverhampton Wanderers in 1933. Barratt failed to make an appearance at Wolves, joining Hednesford Town in 1937. Later that year, Barratt signed for Stafford Rangers. In February 1938, Barratt signed for Rochdale. At Rochdale, Barratt made his only Football League appearance, playing in a 1–1 draw against Doncaster Rovers on 6 September 1938. In 1939, Barratt returned to Stafford Rangers. Later that year, Barratt signed for Chelmsford City.

References

1916 births
2002 deaths
Association football defenders
English footballers
Sportspeople from Stafford
Wolverhampton Wanderers F.C. players
Hednesford Town F.C. players
Stafford Rangers F.C. players
Rochdale A.F.C. players
Chelmsford City F.C. players
English Football League players
Southern Football League players